Avianca Ecuador serves the following destinations:

References

Avianca Ecuador